Rudy Svorinich Jr. (born 1960) is an American politician who served on the Los Angeles City Council for the 15th district. He was elected to the council in 1993, defeating three-term incumbent Joan Milke Flores, and served two full terms until 2001.

Personal life 
Svorinich was born in 1960 in San Pedro, Los Angeles to Rudy Svorinich Sr. and Winifred Svorinich. He attended San Pedro High School and graduated from California State University Dominguez Hills with bachelor's degree in business administration.

Political career 
In 1992, Svorinich ran for the Los Angeles City Council's 15th district against incumbent Joan Milke Flores. He placed second in the primary, and in the general election ousted Flores in the election by a five-point margin. During his first term, five of his aides quit, to which Svorinich portrayed as a reorganization of the office. Many other aides were also fired, which prompted allegations of misconduct, but an ethics panel found no campaign violations.

In 1997, he was opposed for re-election by three candidates who tried to force Svorinich into a runoff by having different candidates prevent Svorinich from having 50% of the vote. In the primary, he was elected 60% of the vote. In 1998, he ran for the Republican nomination for the California's 36th congressional district, but lost to Steven T. Kuykendall.

Post-Council 
In 2000, as he was term limited for the City Council, Svorinich made an unsuccessful bid for California's 54th State Assembly district, being defeated by Democrat Alan Lowenthal by a double-digit margin. Svorinich ran for his old seat in the 2011 special election after Hahn was elected to the United States House of Representatives, but lost the primary placing fourth overall.

In 2001, he founded Svorinich & Associates, Inc., a consulting firm. He is currently President of Svorinich Companies, Inc. a government-affairs firm in San Pedro, as well as the president of Svorinich Political Services, a political consulting and campaign-management company.

Electoral history

1993

1997

References 

1960 births
Living people
American people of Croatian descent
Los Angeles City Council members
California Republicans